The 2022 Ypres Rally (also known as the Ardeca Ypres Rally 2022) was a motor racing event for rally cars that was held over four days between 18 and 21 August 2022. It marked the fifty-eighth running of the Ypres Rally. The event was the ninth round of the 2022 World Rally Championship, World Rally Championship-2 and World Rally Championship-3.

Thierry Neuville and Martijn Wydaeghe were the defending rally winners. Their team, Hyundai Shell Mobis WRT, were the defending manufacturers' winners. Jari Huttunen and Mikko Lukka were the defending rally winners in the WRC-2 category. Yohan Rossel and Alexandre Coria were the defending rally winners in the WRC-3 category, but neither of them defended their titles as Rossel stepped up to WRC-2, while Coria moved to the top-tier to co-drive with Adrien Fourmaux for M-Sport.

Ott Tänak and Martin Järveoja won their third rally of the season. Their team, Hyundai Shell Mobis WRT, successfully defended their title. Stéphane Lefebvre and Andy Malfoy won the World Rally Championship-2 category. Jan Černý and Tom Woodburn won the World Rally Championship-3 category.

Background

Entry list
The following crews entered into the rally. The event was opened to crews competing in the World Rally Championship, its support categories, the World Rally Championship-2 and World Rally Championship-3, and privateer entries that are not registered to score points in any championship. Ten entered under Rally1 regulations, as were twenty-one Rally2 crews in the World Rally Championship-2 and three Rally3 crews in the World Rally Championship-3.

Itinerary
All dates and times are CEST (UTC+2).

Report

WRC Rally1

Classification

Special stages

Championship standings

WRC-2 Rally2

Classification

Special stages

Championship standings

WRC-3 Rally3

Classification

Special stages

Championship standings

Notes

References

External links

  
 2022 Ypres Rally at eWRC-results.com
 2022 Ypres Rally at rally-maps.com 

2022 in Belgian motorsport
Belgium
August 2022 sports events in Belgium
2022